The 2005 IPSC Handgun World Shoot XIV held in Guayaquil, Ecuador was the 14th IPSC Handgun World Shoot. Once again, Eric Grauffel took the Open title. He was now an 18-year-old student and had already won many European titles, and after the 2005 World Championship, also three World Shoots.

Champions

Open 
The Open division had the largest match participation with 300 competitors (33.8 %).

Individual

Teams Open

Modified 
The Modified division had 49 competitors (5.5 %).

Individual

Teams Modified

Standard 
The Standard division had the second largest match participation with 294 competitors (33.1 %).

Individual

Teams Standard

Production 
The Production division had the third largest match participation with 213 competitors (24.0 %).

Individual

Teams Production

Revolver 
The Revolver division had 31 competitors (3.5 %).

Individual

Teams Revolver

See also 
IPSC Rifle World Shoots
IPSC Shotgun World Shoot
IPSC Action Air World Shoot

References

 Official Final Results (Full): 2005 HG World Shoot XIV
 IPSC :: Match Results (Summary) - 2005 Handgun World Shoot, Ecuador
 IPSC Worldshoot XIV - Overall Match Results

2005
2005 in shooting sports
Shooting competitions in Ecuador
2005 in Ecuadorian sport
International sports competitions hosted by Ecuador
21st century in Guayaquil
Sports competitions in Guayaquil